Midwest Kings (aka MWK) is a touring band based in Tulsa, Oklahoma, whose  most notable member is David Cook, winner of the seventh season of American Idol. Described as a "regional touring band", the Midwest Kings play throughout the midwest, including gigs in states ranging from their home base of Oklahoma, through Kansas, Missouri, Nebraska, and Wisconsin.

Discography

Albums
 Song for a King
 Winds of Change: The Acoustics
 Midwest Kings (2003)
 Judging a Bullet (2005)
 Incoherent With Desire to Move On (2006)
 Luna Despierta (2008)
 The Sanctuary Live Sessions (2010)
 Luna Espera (2011)
 Luna Se Hunde (2012)

References

External links
Midwest Kings on MySpace
NealTiemann.com
Official Website
Midwest Kings Twitter Page
Midwest Kings on RockAlmanac.com

2001 establishments in Oklahoma
American hard rock musical groups
Musical groups established in 2001
Rock music groups from Oklahoma